Dolichoderus lujae is a species of ant in the genus Dolichoderus. Described by Santschi in 1923, the species is endemic to Brazil.

References

Dolichoderus
Hymenoptera of South America
Insects described in 1923